John Stevens (born October 18, 1973) is an American politician who serves in the Tennessee Senate from the 24th district as a member of the Republican Party.

Early life

John Stevens was born on October 18, 1973. From 1992 to 1996, he attended the University of Tennessee at Martin and graduated with a Bachelor of Science in political science and English. From 1999 to 2000, he attended Cumberland School of Law. From 2000 to 2002, he attended the University of Memphis and graduated with a Juris Doctor.

Tennessee Senate

Elections

In 2012, Stevens won the Republican primary against Danny C. Jowers for a seat in the Tennessee Senate from the 24th district. In the general election he defeated Democratic nominee Brad Thompson. In 2016, Stevens won in the Republican primary and general election without opposition.

During the 2020 Republican primary Governor Bill Lee campaigned for Stevens. In the Republican primary Stevens defeated Casey L. Hood.

Tenure

During the 2020 United States Senate election in Tennessee Stevens endorsed Bill Hagerty.

Political positions

On July 1, 2020, Nashville District Attorney Glenn Funk announced that people with less than half an ounce of marijuana would not be prosecuted. Stevens criticized Funk and stated that "the honorable thing to do is resign your office."

Ratings

In 2017, the American Conservative Union gave Stevens a 100% rating. The National Rifle Association gave Stevens an A+ rating and endorsed him for reelection in 2020. In 2020, Americans for Prosperity gave Stevens an rating of 108%.

Electoral history

References

External links
 
 John Stevens on Twitter

1973 births
21st-century American politicians
Living people
People from Huntingdon, Tennessee
Tennessee lawyers
Republican Party Tennessee state senators
University of Tennessee at Martin alumni
University of Memphis alumni